The 6th Assembly District of Wisconsin is one of 99 districts in the Wisconsin State Assembly. Located in northeast Wisconsin, the district comprises most of Shawano County, including the city of Shawano, and northwest Outagamie County, as well as municipalities in northwest Brown County and northeast Waupaca County. The district is represented by Republican Peter Schmidt, since January 2023. The 6th Assembly district is located within Wisconsin's 2nd Senate district, along with the 4th and 5th Assembly districts.

List of past representatives

References 

Wisconsin State Assembly districts
Brown County, Wisconsin
Outagamie County, Wisconsin
Shawano County, Wisconsin
Waupaca County, Wisconsin